Miguel Mas may refer to:
Miguel Mas (cyclist) (born 1943), Spanish cyclist
Miguel Mas (actor) (born 1967), Argentinian actor, writer, and director